Blaizer may refer to:

 Blaizer (Chaotic), a fictional character
 Blaizer (composer) (21st century), Swedish music composer

See also

 Blaize (disambiguation)
 Blazer (disambiguation)